

References

External links
Academy website
Current OFSTED report

Secondary schools in Cheshire West and Chester
Academies in Cheshire West and Chester
School buildings in the United Kingdom destroyed by arson